Portrait of a Young Man as Saint Sebastian is an oil painting on panel of  by Bronzino in the Museo Thyssen-Bornemisza in Madrid. It entered that museum's collection in 1984 from a private collection in Rieti. The work has been related to the very similar figure of Saint Matthew from the four tondi in the Capponi Chapel, on which Bronzino collaborated with Pontormo, and to a study for it which is now in the Uffizi.

References

1533 paintings
Paintings by Bronzino
Paintings in the Thyssen-Bornemisza Museum
Bronzino
Portraits of men